The 2012 Reginal Council Elections (cz. Volby do krajských zastupitelstev) were held on the 12th and 13th of October in all administrative regions (cz. Kraje) of the Czech Republic, with the exception of Prague. The election was won by the Czech Social Democratic Party (ČSSD), which received the most votes in 9 of the 13 regions despite experiencing a significant drop in voter share overall.

Background
The previous regional election in 2008 had been won by the ČSSD, who had received the most votes in all participating regions. In the months leading up to the 2012 election support for them decreased, though according to polls they still remained in the lead. Similarly, the center right Civic Democratic Party (ODS) had decreased in popularity. This is likely the result of increasing loss of confidence in the traditional established parties that led to more voters choosing to support non-parliamentary, less powerful parties. Perhaps as a result of this trend, the Czech Communist Party (KSČM), which had been largely politically marginalized since the Velvet Revolution, had seen an increase in support according to polls.

Results

Jihočeský kraj (South Bohemian region)
ČSSD won the 2008 election in the region with 33.80% of the vote and formed a coalition with ODS.

Polls

1 "Dělnická strana sociální spravedlnosti - STOP NEPŘIZPŮSOBIVÝM!" is a coalition of the Workers' Party and the Party for Europe, which contested the 2008 election as "Dělnická strana - za zrušení poplatků ve zdravotnictví".
2 South Bohemian coalition of SNK European Democrats and Party for an Independent Czech Republic, which contested the 2008 election as SNK European Democrats.
3 "SUVERENITA - Blok Jany Bobošíkové pro JIHOČESKÝ KRAJ" is a coalition of Sovereignty – Jana Bobošíková Bloc and Suverenita - Strana důstojného života, which contested the 2008 election as Strana důstojného života.

Results

Jihomoravský kraj (South Moravian region)
Czech Social Democratic Party won the 2008 election in the region with 34.84% of votes and formed a coalition with ODS.

Polls

 "Sdružení nestraníků"

Results

In summer 2010 the coalition collapsed and ODS was replaced by KDU-ČSL.

Karlovarský kraj (Karlovy Vary region)
ČSSD won the 2008 election in the region with 31.39% of votes and formed a coalition with the Communist Party and Doktoři (za uzdravení společnosti).

Polls

1 Alternativa pro kraj (Alternative for the region)
2 Koalice pro kraj (Coalition for the region) is a coalition of the KDU-ČSL, Greens and the movement "O Co Jim Jde?!". In the 2008 election a coalition of the same name consisted of KDU-ČSL and Hnutí nezávislých za harmonický rozvoj obcí a měst (Movement of independents for the harmonic development of municipalities) which did not join the 2012 coalition.
3 Doktoři (za uzdravení společnosti) (Doctors for restoration of society)
4 Dělnická strana sociální spravedlnosti - STOP NEPŘIZPŮSOBIVÝM! is coalition of Dělnická strana sociální spravedlnosti and Strana pro Evropu, in 2008 election as Dělnická strana - za zrušení poplatků ve zdravotnictví
5 Volte Pravý Blok - www.cibulka.net

Results

until November 2009

Královéhradecký kraj (Hradec Králové region)

Czech Social Democratic Party won 2008 election in region with 31.94% of votes and formed coalition with Coalition for Hradec Hrálové region and SNK ED.

Polls

1 Koalice pro Královéhradecký kraj is coalition of KDU-ČSL, Hradecký demokratický klub (Democratic club of Hradec) and Volba pro město (Vote for the City), in 2008 election of KDU-ČSL and Nestraníci (Non-partisans)
2 Změna pro Královéhradecký kraj is a coalition of Greens and political movement Změna (Change)
3 Dělnická strana sociální spravedlnosti - STOP NEPŘIZPŮSOBIVÝM! is coalition of Dělnická strana sociální spravedlnosti and Strana pro Evropu, in 2008 election as Dělnická strana - za zrušení poplatků ve zdravotnictví
4 Volte Pravý Blok - www.cibulka.net

Results

Liberecký kraj (Liberec region)
Czech Social Democratic Party won 2008 election in region with 26.79% of votes and formed coalition with Mayors and independents for Liberec region and Party for the Open Society.

Polls

1 Změna pro Liberecký kraj (Change for Liberec region) is coalition of movement Změna (Change) and Greens, 2008 election result is that of Green Party
2 Nová budoucnost pro Liberecký kraj (New Future for Liberec region)
3 Česká strana selského rozumu
4 result of 2008 election is for Koalice pro Liberecký kraj, which KDU-ČSL was part of
5 Dělnická strana sociální spravedlnosti - STOP NEPŘIZPŮSOBIVÝM! is coalition of Dělnická strana sociální spravedlnosti and Strana pro Evropu, in 2008 election as Dělnická strana - za zrušení poplatků ve zdravotnictví

Results

Moravskoslezský kraj (Moravian-Silesian region)
Czech Social Democratic Party won 2008 election in region with 42.63% of votes and formed coalition with Communist Party of Bohemia and Moravia.

Polls

1 Dělnická strana sociální spravedlnosti - STOP NEPŘIZPŮSOBIVÝM! is coalition of Dělnická strana sociální spravedlnosti and Strana pro Evropu, in 2008 election as Dělnická strana - za zrušení poplatků ve zdravotnictví
2 SNK is coalition of SNK ED and Město lidem (City to the people), in 2008 election of SNK ED and Coexistentia
3 SUVERENITA - Blok Jany Bobošíkové pro MORAVSKOSLEZSKÝ KRAJ is coalition of SUVERENITA - Blok Jany Bobošíkové and SUVERENITA - STRANA DŮSTOJNÉHO ŽIVOTA, in 2008 election as Strana důstojného života
4 Protest - nevolím parlamentní strany is coalition of Občané 2011, Strana práce and Občané.cz

Results

Olomoucký kraj (Olomouc region)

Czech Social Democratic Party won the 2008 election in this region with 39.78% of votes and formed a coalition with Civic Democratic Party and KDU-ČSL.

Polls

1 Koalice pro Olomoucký kraj společně se starosty (Coalition for Olomouc region together with Mayors) is coalition of SZ and KDU-ČSL, in 2008 election the parties ran independently.
2 in 2008 election as Nezávislí starostové pro kraj (Independent Mayors for region)
3 Nezávislá volba
4 SUVERENITA - Blok Jany Bobošíkové - ZMĚNA PRO OLOMOUCKÝ KRAJ is coalition of SUVERENITA - Blok Jany Bobošíkové and SUVERENITA - STRANA DŮSTOJNÉHO ŽIVOTA, in 2008 independently as Strana zdravého rozumu and Strana důstojného života

Results

Pardubický kraj (Pardubice region)
Czech Social Democratic Party won 2008 election in region with 35.73% of votes and formed coalition with Coalition for Pardubice region.

Polls

1 Koalice pro Pardubický kraj is coalition of KDU-ČSL, SNK ED and Nestraníci
2 in 2008 as Nezávislí starostové pro kraj
3 Dělnická strana sociální spravedlnosti - STOP NEPŘIZPŮSOBIVÝM! is coalition of Dělnická strana sociální spravedlnosti and Strana pro Evropu, in 2008 election as Dělnická strana - za zrušení poplatků ve zdravotnictví
4 Volte Pravý Blok - www.cibulka.net

Results

Plzeňský kraj (Plzeň region)

Czech Social Democratic Party won 2008 election in region with 36.37% of votes and formed coalition with support of communists.

Polls

1 Koalice pro Plzeňský kraj is coalition of KDU-ČSL, SsČR and Nezávislí, in 2008 election of KDU-ČSL and SNK ED
2 Sdružení pro náš kraj - SNK
3 Dělnická strana sociální spravedlnosti - STOP NEPŘIZPŮSOBIVÝM! is coalition of Dělnická strana sociální spravedlnosti and Strana pro Evropu, in 2008 election as Dělnická strana-Ne americkému radaru
4 "Sdružení nestraníků"

Results

Středočeský kraj (Central Bohemian region)
Czech Social Democratic Party won 2008 election in region with 35.16% of votes and formed a government with support of communists.

Polls

1 in 2008 as Nezávislí starostové pro Středočeský kraj
2 "Sdružení nestraníků"
3 Koalice KDU-ČSL, SNK ED a nezávislých, in 2008 election as Koalice pro Středočeský kraj
4 Hnutí na podporu dobrovolných hasičů a dalších dobrovolníků
5 Volte Pravý Blok - www.cibulka.net
6 SUVERENITA - blok Jany Bobošíkové, Strana zdravého rozumu, in 2008 as Strana zdravého rozumu
7 UNP - Středočeši 2012

Results

Ústecký kraj (Ústí region)

Czech Social Democratic Party won 2008 election in region with 32.78% of votes and formed coalition with Civic Democratic Party and Mirko Bernas who left Severočeši.cz.

Polls

1 PRO! kraj is coalition of SZ, KDU-ČSL, HNHRM, Koalice pro Benešov and B10, in 2008 election as SZ
2 Dělnická strana sociální spravedlnosti - STOP NEPŘIZPŮSOBIVÝM! is coalition of Dělnická strana sociální spravedlnosti and Strana pro Evropu, in 2008 election as Dělnická strana - za zrušení zdravotnických poplatků
3 Koalice SNK Evropští demokraté a Strana Zdraví, Sportu a Prosperity, in 2008 election ran independently
4 NESPOKOJENÍ OBČANÉ!
5 in 2008 as Strana zdravého rozumu

Results

kraj Vysočina (Vysočina region)

Czech Social Democratic Party won 2008 election in region with 39.87% of votes and formed coalition with support of communists.

Polls

1 Pro Vysočinu is coalition of SNK ED and Nestraníci, result of 2008 election is of SNK ED only
2 Starostové pro občany

Results

Zlínský kraj (Zlín region)

Czech Social Democratic Party won 2008 election in region with 35.40% of votes and formed coalition with Civic Democratic Party and Christian Democrats.

Polls

1 Starostové a TOP 09 pro Zlínský kraj, in 2008 election as Starostové a nezávislí pro Zlínský kraj
2 Lékaři  odborníci za ozdravení kraje
3 in 2008 election as part of Koalice nestraníků
4 Za Morální Očistu Regionu
5 Hnutí odborníků za Zlínský kraj

Results

References

Regional elections
Regional elections
Czech regional elections
2012